Chauncey Brooke Baker (August 26, 1860 – October 18, 1936) was an American army officer and Brigadier general active during World War I.

Early life 
Baker was born in Lancaster, Ohio. He attended the United States Military Academy and graduated number forty-one of seventy-seven in the class of 1886.
He also attended the Infantry and Cavalry School at Fort Leavenworth, in Kansas where he graduated with honor in 1889.

Career 

Baker was aide to General Alexander McDowell McCook from 1890 to 1895 as well as serving on frontier duty from 1886 to 1898. He was a depot quartermaster in Havana from August 1900 to May 1902.

He then served in the office of the Quartermaster General from 1914 to 1916.

He was senior member of the military commission to France in July 1917 and promoted to brigadier general of the National Army. Soon after his promotion, he became Chief of Embarkation Service for the office of the Chief of Staff in the War Department where he served until February 1918.
In April 1921, he retired as a colonel.

Baker authored at least four books, including:
 Notes of Fire Tactics, 1889
 Transportation of Troops and Materiel, 1905. 
 Handbook of Transportation by Rail and Commercial Vessels, 1916. 
 Coordination Between Transportation Companies and the Military Service, 1916.
 Motor Transportation for the Army: A Lecture Delivered Before the Officers of the Quartermaster Reserve Corps at Washington, D.C., on May 29, 1917. Washington [D.C.]: G.P.O., 1917.

Death and legacy
Chauncey Brooke Baker died in Washington, D.C., on October 18, 1936.  He was buried at Arlington National Cemetery, Section 3, site 1927.

References

Bibliography 
Davis, Henry Blaine. Generals in Khaki. Raleigh, NC: Pentland Press, 1998.  
Marquis Who's Who, Inc. Who Was Who in American History, the Military. Chicago: Marquis Who's Who, 1975.  

1860 births
1936 deaths
United States Army generals
United States Military Academy alumni
United States Army generals of World War I
Burials at Arlington National Cemetery
Military personnel from Ohio